Juan Martos (born 15 June 1939) is a Spanish basketball player. He competed in the men's tournament at the 1960 Summer Olympics.

References

1939 births
Living people
Spanish men's basketball players
Olympic basketball players of Spain
Basketball players at the 1960 Summer Olympics
Basketball players from Barcelona